Heinz Sames (10 July 1911 – 1943) was a German speed skater. He competed in four events at the 1936 Winter Olympics. He was killed in action during World War II in the Battle of Stalingrad.

References

1911 births
1943 deaths
German male speed skaters
Olympic speed skaters of Germany
Speed skaters at the 1936 Winter Olympics
Speed skaters from Berlin
German military personnel killed in World War II
Missing in action of World War II
20th-century German people